Gerald O'Leary (born 1942) is a retired Irish hurler. He played hurling at club level with Blackrock and at inter-county level as a member of the Cork senior hurling team.

Honours

Blackrock
Cork Senior Hurling Championship (1): 1961

Cork
All-Ireland Senior Hurling Championship (1): 1966
Munster Senior Hurling Championship (1): 1966

References

1942 births
Living people
Blackrock National Hurling Club hurlers
Cork inter-county hurlers